Abdullah Al Damluji (1890–1971), also known as Abdullah Beg Al Damluji, was an Iraqi physician who served as one of Ibn Saud's advisers. He held several government positions, including the minister of foreign affairs of Najd and Hejaz and of Iraq.

Early life and education 
Damluji was born in Mosul, Iraq, in 1890. He was a graduate of the Military College of Medicine and Haidar Pasha Medical College, both in Constantinople. He had a good command of French.

Career
Damluji was one of the physicians who served in the Ottoman army during the Balkan War in the period 1912–1913. In 1914 he had to leave Constantinople because of his nationalist affairs and joined the entourage of Ibn Saud as a physician in 1915. Then he was made a member of the royal court accompanying the foreign visitors and replaced Ahmed Al Thunayan as Ibn Saud's chief foreign affairs advisor.   

In 1924 he was sent to Mecca together with Hafiz Wahba and Abdullah Suleiman following the capture of the city to monitor the social, cultural, political and economic conditions. In 1926 he became Ibn Saud's personal representative in Hejaz. In 1926 Damluji was appointed the deputy minister of foreign affairs which he held until 1928 when he was replaced by Fuad Hamza in the post. In fact, Damluji was the foreign minister of Najd and Hejaz.

Damluji returned to his native Iraq in September 1928 and became the consul-general of Iraq in Cairo. Next he served as the minister of foreign affairs of Iraq for one year, 1930–1931. He was elected as the deputy for Mosul and was appointed director general of public health in 1932. He was made the chief chamberlain to the King in 1933 and was again appointed minister of foreign affairs in 1934 which he held for one year. From 1934 to 1936 Damluji was director general of public health.

References

Abdullah
20th-century Iraqi politicians
20th-century Iraqi physicians
Abdullah
1890 births
1971 deaths
Abdullah
Abdullah
Ottoman military doctors
Abdullahl